Von Grey is an American indie rock band from Atlanta, Georgia, formed in 2011 by sisters Annika, Fiona, and Kathryn von Grey. The group's youngest member, Petra, stepped away from the band in October 2016 to focus on her schooling.

Von Grey's music has been described as having an ambient/electro sound marked by moody synths, heady beats, and inventive usage of acoustic/classical instrumentation.

Album history 
Von Grey's self-titled debut EP, recorded with Grammy-winning producer and engineer Nick DiDia (Bruce Springsteen, Train, The Gaslight Anthem), was released on October 2, 2012. In 2012, Von Grey played a sold-out west coast tour with Lindsey Stirling, followed by an additional tour with Company of Thieves.

Von Grey made their network television debut in February 2013 on The Late Show with David Letterman, followed by an appearance on Rock Center with Brian Williams in March 2013 and Conan on April 2, 2013. The band also performed at the 2013 Bonnaroo.

On January 21, 2014 Von Grey released their second EP, Awakening. The release was supported by nationwide tours with Ron Pope, Parachute, and the Indigo Girls, as well as a performance at Austin City Limits Music Festival. 
	
The band's third studio EP, Panophobia, was released on August 14, 2015, and showcased the band's evolution to a genre NYLON Magazine called "haunting, moody indie rock."

On April 28, 2017, the band released a single, "Poison In The Water", from their forthcoming EP, Trinity, following a brief hiatus. In a May 2017 interview at Paste Studios in New York, Annika von Grey called the break "development which was really healthy for us creatively and emotionally."

Trinity's followup single, 6 AM, premiered on NPR's First Listen on June 29, 2017. Of the track, acclaimed music journalist Bob Boilen wrote, "ethereal and catchy don't often make a perfect pair within pop music, but the combination is exactly what hooked me on VON GREY, an Atlanta trio formed by the siblings Kathryn, Annika and Fiona von Grey." The self-directed video for the song premiered on One's To Watch late August 2017.

The Trinity EP was released commercially on December 8, 2017.

On May 7, 2018, VON GREY premiered a new single, "Plans" in Billboard Magazine and announced In Bloom: Acoustic, a new, self-produced six-song EP set for release on July 20, 2018.

References

External links 
 http://www.vongreymusic.com

American indie pop musicians
Musical groups from Georgia (U.S. state)